Palaeomedusa testa is an extinct species of thalassochelydian turtle from the Tithonian of the Late Jurassic (145.5 to 150.8 million years ago). It was first described by the German palaeontologist Christian Erich Hermann von Meyer in 1860. It is the only species classified under the genus Palaeomedusa.

See also
Thalassemys

References

Thalassochelydia
Prehistoric turtle genera
Monotypic prehistoric reptile genera
Tithonian genera
Late Jurassic turtles
Late Jurassic reptiles of Europe
Jurassic Germany
Fossils of Germany
Solnhofen fauna
Fossil taxa described in 1860
Taxa named by Christian Erich Hermann von Meyer